Michael Miu Kiu-wai (苗僑偉) (born 18 June 1958) is a Hong Kong actor and businessman. His career has been met with popular success in his youth, followed by a resurgence in middle age after a period of hiatus. He is considered one of the most popular Hong Kong actors of the 1980s. Miu is best known for the villainous Yeung Hong in the 1983 television drama The Legend of the Condor Heroes.

Early life
Born in Zhoushan, Zhejiang in 1958, Miu and his mother moved to Hong Kong to rejoin his father when he was five. Miu rarely saw his father, a merchant mariner, and was mainly raised by his mother. Near the end of high school, Miu's father was diagnosed with cancer. As a result, he left school and began working as a carpenter to support his family.

Career
Miu was scouted and brought into TVB's Acting Academy in September 1979. While still in training, he made cameo appearances in several major dramas, such as The Bund (1980). Miu's official acting debut was in the 1980 drama The Adventurer's. Immediately after graduating from the Academy, Miu was offered a major role in the 1981 thriller drama The Lonely Hunter, starring alongside his classmate Felix Wong with seniors Carol Cheng and Money Chan.

From 1981 to 1986, Miu together with Tony Leung, Andy Lau, Felix Wong and Kent Tong were promoted as TVB's Five Tigers, a group of five of the most popular young actors in Hong Kong at the time. In 1987, Miu left TVB, and stepped back from the industry to focus on business ventures.

During the 90s, Miu devoted himself to his eyewear business and earned a reputation as a businessman. Due to the reasons of Hong Kong's economic downturn and uncertainty over retail industry in the future, he sold his business, The Optical Centre, in 2002 to Luxottica. His comeback performance was in the 2005 cop drama The Academy, which earned him major recognition and propelled him forward.

Miu starred in the 2014 crime drama Line Walker as Cheuk Hoi and became a strong contender for Best Actor in 2014 TVB Anniversary Awards. He reprised his role in Line Walker: The Prelude won Best Actor in a Leading Role award at the TVB Star Awards Malaysia 2017. In 2020, Miu reprised his role as Cheuk Hoi for the third time in the sequel Line Walker: Bull Fight.

Also, in 2017, he was the narrator for the Hong Kong (Cantonese) version of Planet Earth 2/Heaven and Earth II (天與地II).

In 2020, he made a guest appearance as himself in episode 997 with Michelle Yim as herself on TVB’s sitcom Come Home Love: Lo and Behold as the spokesperson and ribbon cutters.

Personal life
Miu first met Hong Kong actress Jaime Chik in 1981 while shooting for the TVB television drama You Only Live Twice. They began dating but separated a year later. Miu dated Anita Mui briefly in 1983, whom he met on the set of Summer Kisses, Winter Tears. Miu and Chik reconciled, and the couple married in 1990. Miu and Chik have two children - a son, Murphy Miu, and daughter, Phoebe Miu, who is also an actor, both of whom reside in Vancouver, Canada.

Filmography

References

External links
Official TVB site

1958 births
Living people
Hong Kong male film actors
Hong Kong male television actors
People from Zhoushan
TVB veteran actors
Male actors from Zhejiang
20th-century Hong Kong male actors
21st-century Hong Kong male actors
Chinese male film actors
Chinese male television actors
20th-century Chinese male actors
21st-century Chinese male actors